Yermakovskaya is a rural locality (a village) in Ustretskoye Rural Settlement, Syamzhensky District, Vologda Oblast, Russia. The population was 28 as of 2002.

Geography 
Yermakovskaya is located 26 km northwest of Syamzha (the district's administrative centre) by road. Savinskaya is the nearest rural locality.

References 

Rural localities in Syamzhensky District